John William Avery (born 11 July 1948) is an Australian former barrister based in Hobart, Tasmania. Avery notably represented the perpetrator of the Port Arthur Massacre, Martin Bryant during pre-trial and sentencing proceedings before the Supreme Court of Tasmania in 1996, before himself being sentenced in the same court for misappropriation and stealing from clients of his firm in 2008.

Early life and education
Avery was born in St Helens, Tasmania. He was educated at Launceston Church Grammar School from 1961 to 1966 and the University of Tasmania, where he graduated Bachelor of Laws in 1971 and Master of Business in 2013. He was admitted as a Barrister and Solicitor of the Supreme Court of Tasmania on 1 February 1972. He worked initially as an employee of a private law firm. He then established his own practice, John W Avery Barristers and Solicitors, later Avery Keal and Avery Partners, practising in criminal law and civil litigation.

Representation of Martin Bryant
In 1996 Avery represented Martin Bryant for the shooting murders of 35 people at Port Arthur on 28–29 April 1996. He is widely regarded as the person responsible for persuading Bryant to plead guilty to each of the charges of murder that had been alleged against him, saying that he brought Bryant to the decision to plead guilty by encouraging him to draw pictures of his actions on 28–29 April 1996 in order to avoid "a show trial, a circus, a pantomime".

Sentencing and imprisonment
On 3 September 2008 Avery was arraigned in the Supreme Court of Tasmania before Chief Justice Ewan Crawford on an indictment alleging one count of misappropriation as a company officer and 133 counts of stealing. Sentencing Avery, Chief Justice Crawford said:

In mitigation, Avery's counsel, David Gunson, SC, had told the court that during his representation of Bryant, Avery had "found the pressures of the media on him was enormous", and that Avery "had described his life after the case as akin to an AFL footballer going back to playing for a country team".

Avery was sentenced to 4 years and 6 months from 3 September 2008, without parole for 2 years and 3 months, and by 28 September 2012 he had been released from jail.

Avery was forced out of the Avery Partners partnership in 2008 when his stealing and misappropriation came to light.

Archibald Prize
In 2010, Avery was the subject of an entry for the Archibald Prize by Hobart artist Stewart MacFarlane, entitled The Collector.

References

20th-century Australian lawyers
1948 births
Living people
Criminals from Tasmania
Tasmanian lawyers
21st-century Australian lawyers